Modern Skirts was an alternative rock band based in Athens, GA. The band consisted of four members: Jay Gulley (guitar and vocals), JoJo Glidewell (guitar, piano, and vocals), Phillip Brantley (bass, guitar, and vocals) and John Q. Swint (drums).

Formation and first album 

Formed in early 2004, the band quickly gained popularity and notoriety in the Athens music scene thanks largely to the buzz created by their high-energy live shows in the Athens area, mostly at the world-famous 40 Watt Club. They released an EP entitled This is Winning and Thinking in 2004. August 2005 saw the independent release of their debut LP, titled Catalogue of Generous Men. The album quickly became a standard in Athens, and won the band the first of several Athens Music Awards. The album has been praised in various media outlets, most notably in Paste Magazine and on National Public Radio. The vocal harmonies and subtle melancholy in songs like "Pasadena" and "Sugarpile" have helped to secure the group's success in Athens and around the Southeast. Modern Skirts prominent use of the piano derives from the significant influences of groups such as The Beach Boys, and their flexible use of song structure centers around catchy melodies and memorable hooks, similar to those used in Brit-Pop and by The Velvet Underground.

European tour and later albums 

The band spent 2006 and 2007 touring intensively up and down the east coast and across the southeastern USA. They enjoyed a short but successful tour in England in the fall of 2007, where they were filmed by producers from The Tube, who became interested in the band after R.E.M. bassist Mike Mills cited Modern Skirts as his favorite Athens band in a post Hall of Fame interview early 2007.

Also in 2007, the band released a single, "Four More Years", as well as recorded a version of the REM song "Perfect Circle" for the tribute album "Finest Worksongs".

The February 2008 issue of Q magazine featured a CD with a single from the then-upcoming All Of Us In Our Night, which was released in October 2008.

During the summer of 2008 the band spent two weeks on a European tour, the highlight of which was opening for R.E.M. in Amsterdam and Belgium.

Modern Skirts' second EP, "Happy 81," was released in July 2010.

Their third and final full-length album, "Gramahawk", was released in 2011, and a single, "Tennessee", in 2012.

Breakup 

On February 28, 2013, the band announced their breakup in an email to fans, and played their last show at the 40 Watt Club on April 5, 2013. The band members all felt "that Modern Skirts has run its course, both creatively and professionally". The band members continue to play music solo.

Discography 

 This Is Winning and Thinking (EP), 2004
 Catalogue of Generous Men, 2005
 Athfest Compilation, 2006
 Finest Worksongs: Athens Bands Play the Music of R.E.M, 2007
 Four More Years (Single), 2007
 All of Us in Our Night, 2008
 Happy 81 (EP), 2010
  Gramahawk, 2011
 Tennessee (Single), 2012

References

 National Public Radio
 Paste Magazine 1
 Flagpole Magazine
 Creative Loafing

External links 
Touring with R.E.M.
Modern Skirts' Official Website
Modern Skirts on Vox
Modern Skirts Music Video on Blender

Alternative rock groups from Georgia (U.S. state)